Günter Perleberg also spelled Günther; (17 March 1935 – 1 August 2019) was a German sprint canoeist who competed in the early 1960s. Competing in two Summer Olympics, he won two medals with a gold in the K-1 4 × 500 m (1960 with the East German team) and a silver in the K-4 1000 m (1964 with the West German team).

Perleberg was born in Brandenburg an der Havel in 1935. He trained with SC Aufbau Magdeburg under Ernst Schmidt.

Perleberg won two medals for East Germany at the 1963 ICF Canoe Sprint World Championships in Jajce with a gold in the K-4 1000 m and a bronze in the K-1 4 × 500 m events. On the last day of the 1963 World Championships he defected to West Germany via Austria to be with his pregnant girlfriend in Havelse near Hanover. Perleberg's status as a Republikflüchtling ("deserter from the republic") caused considerable friction between the two German national committees for determining the United Team of Germany at the 1964 Summer Olympics. In the end, Avery Brundage as President of the International Olympic Committee suggested that separate qualification races be held; those involving Perleberg in West Germany and those not involving him in East Germany. That suggestion was followed and Perleberg qualified in the K-4 at the Wedau Regatta Course in Duisburg while the other races were held at the regatta course in Grünau in East Berlin. He acted as an official for the canoeing association in Lower Saxony after his active career.

By profession a civil engineer, he had a civil engineering consultancy in Garbsen.

References

 
 
 

1935 births
2019 deaths
German male canoeists
Olympic canoeists of the United Team of Germany
Olympic gold medalists for the United Team of Germany
Olympic silver medalists for the United Team of Germany
Olympic medalists in canoeing
Medalists at the 1960 Summer Olympics
Medalists at the 1964 Summer Olympics
Canoeists at the 1960 Summer Olympics
Canoeists at the 1964 Summer Olympics
ICF Canoe Sprint World Championships medalists in kayak
East German defectors
Sportspeople from Brandenburg an der Havel